Jusepe de Ribera (1591 – 1652) was a painter and printmaker, who along with Francisco de Zurbarán, Bartolomé Esteban Murillo, and the singular Diego Velázquez, are regarded as the major artists of Spanish Baroque painting. Referring to a series of Ribera exhibitions held in the late 20th century, Philippe de Montebello wrote "If Ribera's status as the undisputed protagonist of Neapolitan painting had ever been in doubt, it was not longer. Indeed, to many it seemed that Ribera emerged from these exhibitions as not simply the greatest Neapolitan artist of his age but one of the outstanding European masters of the seventeenth century." Jusepe de Ribera has also been referred to as José de Ribera, Josep de Ribera, and Lo Spagnoletto ("the Little Spaniard") by his contemporaries, early historians, and biographers.

Ribera created history paintings, including traditional Biblical subjects and episodes from Greek mythology, but he is perhaps best known for his numerous views of martyrdom, which at times are brutal scenes depicting bound saints and satyrs as they are flayed or crucified in agony. Less familiar are his occasional, but accomplished portraits, still lifes, and landscapes. Nearly half of his surviving work consist of half length portraits of workers and beggars, often older individuals in ragged clothes, posing as various philosophers, saints, apostles, and allegorical figures. Ribera's paintings, particularly his early work, are characterized by stark realism using a chiaroscuro or tenebrous style. His later work embraced a greater use of color, softer light, and more complex compositions, although he never entirely abandoned his Caravaggisti leanings.

Very little is known about the first 20 years of his life and there are many gaps concerning his later life and career as well. He was baptized on February 17, 1591 in Játiva, Spain, his father identified as a shoemaker. He is not recorded again until 1611, when records show he was paid for a painting (now lost) for a church in Parma, Italy. Documents show he was a member of the Accademia di San Luca in Rome by October of 1613 and living in a house in the Via Margutta in 1615–16, at that time known as "the foreigner's quarter", apparently living a bohemian life with his brothers and other artists. Anecdotal accounts written at the time indicate he quickly earned a reputation as an outstanding painter after arriving in Rome and was making great profits, but also noted his laziness and extravagant spending.

He moved to Naples in late 1616, under Spanish rule at that time, and in November married Caterina Azzolino, the daughter of Sicilian painter, Giovanni Bernardino Azzolini. There he remained for the rest of his life, setting up a workshop with many pupils, securing commissions, and establishing an international reputation. In 1626 he received the Cross of the Order of Christ from Pope Urban VIII. His health began to deteriorate in 1643 and his productivity declined from that time on, and by 1649 he was experiencing financial hardships as well. However, when his health permitted, he continued to produce several fine paintings into the last year of his life.

Life

Early biographies
His Italian biographers have many tales to tell of Ribera's stormy, picaresque career, and picture "Lo Spagnoletto's"  life as an endless series of professional intrigues and rivalries, attempted poisonings due to gelosia di mestiere, conspiracies and brawls, triumphs and adversities, dramatic love affairs. Alterations of dark patches and dazzling light, glooms and raptures – just as in his paintings. Perhaps we would do better to keep to the records and established dates of Ribera's life." Jacques Lassaigne (1952)

Biographers of Ribera in the 17th and 18th century, including Bernardo De Dominici, Carlo Celano, and Palomino de Castro y Velasco   produced a substantial amount of information on the artist's life that is now known to be erroneous. Much of this misinformation was pervasive well into the 20th century and is occasionally still repeated today. It was long believed he was born in 1587, De Dominici saying he was from Gallipoli, Apulia while Celano stated he was from Lecce. One said he descended from nobility, and another identified his father as a Spanish army officer. Research and documents emerged in the 20th century have proven these false.	 Other episodes and events in Ribera's life remain unverified. Early accounts (still repeated today) state that Ribera began his art education in Valencia, where he was a pupil of Francisco Ribalta. Although this is entirely plausible, there is no real evidence to confirm it.

De Dominici's biography described Ribera as an egotistical and condescending individual of reprehensible behavior. He was reputed to have been chief of the so-called Cabal of Naples, his abettors being a Greek painter, Belisario Corenzio and the Neapolitan Giambattista Caracciolo, however there are no real documents or records to substantiate (or discredit) this other than these early biographies. De Dominici's biography has been called "barefaced lies" by one modern historian, and "a caricature" by another, although the latter noted a critical examination of it can still provide some insights.

Early life (1591–1616)

Little information is available on Ribera's youth. It was as recent as 1923 that the year of his birth was positively established. He was baptized on February 17, 1591 in Játiva, Spain, about 60 km. (37 mi.) south of Valencia. His parents were identified as Simón and Margarita (née Curo) Ribera, married in 1588, and his father's occupation a shoemaker. Other baptismal records show the couple had two other sons, Jerónimo (b.1588) and Juan (b.1593). A gap of 20 years follows his baptism record, including  information regarding his childhood, education, teachers, and when he left Spain.

Ribera's move to the Italian Peninsula and his training as an artist have been subjects of interest to art historians in recent decades. His 18th century biographer Palomino wrote that he apprenticed with the Spanish painter Francisco Ribalta in Valencia, and this was generally accepted by historians into the mid to late 20th century, although no proof of this connection exists. Recently historians have begin to question this scenario. There is some evidence to suggest Ribera might have been in Italy as early as 1608-1609 (age 17 or 18), or even as early as 1605-1606 (age 14 or 15). Marriage records show that his father, Simón, married a second time in 1597 when Jusepe was six years old, and a third time in 1607 when he was 16, suggesting some disruption and lack of continuity in Ribera youth.  Recent decades have also shed light on Ribera's presumed teacher Francisco Ribalta, whose early works exhibit a mannerist style, and is now known to have only reached his final and mature period, reflecting a realist and Caravaggesque current about 1614, at which point Ribera is already documented working in Italy. Some historians also believe Ribera's drawing technique shows a thoroughly Italian education and influences.

Records show Ribera was in Parma, Italy in June 1611, where he received payment for a painting of Saint Martin Sharing His Cloak with  a Beggar, for the Church of San Prospero. It is notable and some indication of Ribera's reputation that a foreigner, at the age 20, was given a commission for a public altarpiece. Lodovico Carracci wrote in 1618, that Ribera was under the protection of the ducal family (House of Farnese) while in Parma which aroused some resentment from local artist. The painting, now lost, is known from copies and prints and was often praised in the local literature until it was taken by Napoleon's troops.

The artist is next confirmed in Rome in October 1613, where records show he was a member of the Accademia di San Luca. Parish registries (Status animarum) verify he observed Easter in 1615 and 1616 and was living in a house on the Via Margutta, then known as the foreigners quarter, with others including his brothers Jerónimo, and Juan who is also known to have been a painter. At that time Rome was the most important center of painting, "the fountainhead of the Baroque", where artist from throughout Europe gravitated, including painters such as Gerrit van Honthorst from the Netherlands, Simon Vouet from Fracne, Adam Elsheimer from Germany, and many others, all exploring various aspects of chiaroscuro and tenebrism in the wake of Caravaggio. The last records of the artist in Rome are a payment of promised alms to the Accademia de San Luca in May 1616, and a bank transaction in July 1616.

In his Considerazioni sulla pittura (1614–1621) Giulio Mancini wrote a brief account of Ribera's time in Rome.  He stated that Guido Reni was an admirer of Ribera's work and that a painter of Ribera's disposition had not been seen in the city for many years, exceptionally high praise in reference to an art center like Rome. He characterized Ribera as a follower of Caravaggio, but more experimental and bolder. According to Mancini, Ribera began working for daily wages in other artists workshops and in time developed a strong reputation and was making great profits. He wrote that Ribera had some problems with Roman authorities when he neglected his Easter confession one year (likely 1614 or earlier). Mancini stated that Ribera could also be lazy at times, indulged in extravagant spending, and that he left Rome in order to avoid his creditors.

Neapolitan period (1616–1643)

The Kingdom of Naples was part of the Spanish Empire during Ribera's lifetime, and was ruled by a succession of Spanish Viceroys. Ribera moved to Naples permanently in 1616. In 1616, Ribera moved to Naples, in order to avoid his creditors (according to Giulio Mancini, who described him as living beyond his means despite a high income). In November, 1616, Ribera married Caterina Azzolino, the daughter of a Sicilian-born Neapolitan painter, Giovanni Bernardino Azzolino, whose connections in the Neapolitan art world helped to establish Ribera early on as a major figure whose presence was to have a lasting impact on the art of the city. His Spanish nationality aligned him with the small Spanish governing class in the city, as well as with important collectors and art dealers from Spanish Flanders. At this point Ribera began to sign his work as "Jusepe de Ribera, español" ("Jusepe de Ribera, Spaniard"). He was able to quickly attract the attention of the Viceroy, Pedro Téllez-Girón, 3rd Duke of Osuna, another recent arrival, who gave him a number of major commissions, which showed the influence of Guido Reni.

Few paintings survive from 1620 to 1626, but this was the period in which most of his best prints were produced. These were at least partly an attempt to attract attention outside of Ribera's Neapolitan circles. His career picked up in the late 1620s, and he was accepted as the leading painter in Naples thereafter. He received the Order of Christ of Portugal from Pope Urban VIII in 1626.

Although Ribera never returned to Spain, many of his paintings were taken back by returning members of the Spanish governing class, such as the Duke of Osuna, and his etchings were brought to Spain by dealers. His influence can be seen in the works of Velázquez, Murillo, and most other Spanish painters of the period.

He has been characterized as selfishly protecting his prosperity, and is reputed to have been chief of the so-called Cabal of Naples, his abettors being a Greek painter, Belisario Corenzio and the Neapolitan Giambattista Caracciolo.

It is said this group aimed to monopolize Neapolitan art commissions, using intrigue, sabotage of work in progress, and even personal threats of violence to frighten away outside competitors such as Annibale Carracci, the Cavalier d'Arpino, Reni, and Domenichino. All of them were invited to work in Naples, but found the place inhospitable. The cabal disbanded at the time of Domenichino's death in 1641.

Ribera's pupils included Hendrick de Somer, Francesco Fracanzano, Luca Giordano, and Bartolomeo Passante. He was followed by Giuseppe Marullo and influenced the painters Agostino Beltrano, Paolo Domenico Finoglio, Giovanni Ricca, and Pietro Novelli.

Later life (1644–1652)
Around 1644, his daughter married a Spanish nobleman in the administration, who died soon after. From 1644, Ribera's ill health greatly reduced his ability to work, although his workshop continued to produce works under his direction. In 1647–1648, during the Masaniello uprising against Spanish rule, he and his family took refuge in the palace of the Viceroy. In 1651 he sold his home, and was in dire financial straits by the time of his death in September 1652.

Work

His early style was influenced by the study of the Spanish and Venetian masters as well as Caravaggio and Correggio. His subject matter was notoriously gruesome, portraying human cruelty and violence with startling naturalism. In the early 1630s his style shifted from stark tenebrism to a more diffused lighting, as seen in The Clubfoot of 1642.

Some major works include Saint Januarius Emerging from the Furnace in the cathedral of Naples; the Descent from the Cross in the Certosa, Naples; the Adoration of the Shepherds (1650) in the Louvre; the Martyrdom of Saint Bartholomew in the Museu Nacional d'Art de Catalunya, Barcelona; and the Pieta in the sacristy of San Martino, Naples. His mythologic subjects are often as violent as his martyrdoms, the most famous being his renditions of Apollo and Marsyas, now in Brussels and Naples, and his Tityos, now in the Prado. The Prado owns fifty-six paintings and another six attributed to Ribera, alongside  eleven drawings, such as Jacob’s Dream (1639); the Louvre contain four of his paintings and seven drawings; the National Gallery, London owns three; and The Real Academia de Bellas Artes de San Fernando owns a nice ensemble of five paintings including The Assumption of Mary Magdalene from El Escorial, and an early Ecce Homo or The head of St John the Baptist. He executed several fine male portraits and a self-portrait. Saint Jerome Writing in the Prado now has been credited to him by Gianni Papi, a Caravaggio expert. He was an important etcher—indeed, the most significant Spanish printmaker before Goya—producing about forty prints, nearly all in the 1620s. The Martyrdom of Saint Philip (1639; often described as Saint Bartholomew due to overlapping iconography) is in the Prado.

Nearly half of Ribera's entire oeuvre consist of  half-length representations of saints, apostles, philosophers, scientists, and allegorical figures. The models for these paintings were the natives from the streets of Rome and Naples, typically humble people such as fishermen, dockworkers, elderly people, and beggars, often characterized by wrinkled skin and ragged clothes, painted with a raw visual intensity.

Legacy

Salvator Rosa and Luca Giordano were his most distinguished followers, who may have been his pupils; others were also Giovanni Do, the Flemish painter Hendrick de Somer (known in Italy as 'Enrico Fiammingo'), Michelangelo Fracanzani, and Aniello Falcone, who was the first considerable painter of battle-pieces.

Ribera's work remained in fashion after his death, largely through the adoption of his hyper-naturalistic depictions of violence in the paintings of pupils like Luca Giordano. The gradual rehabilitation of his international reputation was aided by exhibitions in Princeton in 1973, of his prints and drawings, and of works in all media in London at the Royal Academy in 1982 and in New York at the Metropolitan Museum of Art in 1992. Since then his oeuvre has gained more attention from critics and scholars. In 2006, a catalogue raisonné of Ribera's work was published, written by the former director of the Museo di Capodimonte in Naples, Nicola Spinosa.

Gallery

Oil paintings
History paintings (oil on canvas unless noted otherwise)

Allegories, philosophers, apostles, and saints

Drawings

Prints: 1616–1630

Notes

References
 Main source: Scholz-Hänsel, Michael. (2000).  Jusepe de Ribera, 1591–1652. Cologne: Könemann.

Further reading
Brown, Jonathan. (1973). Jusepe de Ribera: prints and drawings; [catalogue of an exhibition] The Art Museum, Princeton University, October–November 1973. Princeton, N.J.: Princeton University.  the standard work on his prints and drawings.

 [full text resource]

External links

 Scholarly articles in English about Jusepe de Ribera, lo Spagnoletto both in web and PDF @ the Spanish Old Masters Gallery

The bearded woman, Work of the month – Ducal House of Medinaceli Foundation
 Curators in Conversation: Ribera. Gabriele Finaldi, Director, National Gallery, London, and Edward Payne, Curator, Spanish Art, Auckland Castle Trust, discuss Ribera.

1591 births
1652 deaths
People from Xàtiva
Artists from the Valencian Community
Spanish Baroque painters
Painters from Naples
17th-century Italian painters
Italian male painters
Italian Baroque painters
Spanish printmakers
Caravaggisti